The  Mack-International Motor Truck Corporation Building is a historic building located in Des Moines, Iowa, United States. It was built by master builder and general contractor J.E. Lovejoy, who was also its original owner. Lovejoy and other tenants had offices on the second floor, while Mack Trucks occupied the ground floor. The front was used to showcase trucks and an industrial service space was in the back of the building. The two-story brick structure grew to take up a full quarter block after annexes were built in about 1931 and 1940. Located in Des Moines' historic Auto Row, the building was listed on the National Register of Historic Places in 2017.

References

Commercial buildings completed in 1924
National Register of Historic Places in Des Moines, Iowa
Commercial buildings on the National Register of Historic Places in Iowa
Buildings and structures in Des Moines, Iowa